James Mulligan (born 14 June 1989) is a professional Australian rules football player who was listed for the Western Bulldogs in the Australian Football League (AFL) until his retirement at the end of the 2012 season. He was drafted to the Western Bulldogs as their first pick and 4th pick overall in the 2008 Rookie draft. Mulligan was elevated to the Bulldog's senior list with the 92nd selection in the 2009 AFL draft . He formerly played for the AFL Queensland team the Southport Sharks.

References

External links
 
 

Western Bulldogs players
Williamstown Football Club players
1989 births
Living people
Australian rules footballers from Queensland
Australian people of Irish descent